Moody Rudolph Tidwell III (born February 15, 1939) is a senior judge of the United States Court of Federal Claims.

Early life, education, and career
Born in Kansas City, Missouri, Tidwell's father, Moody R. Tidwell, Jr., was an officer in the United States Air Force Judge Advocate General's Corps, who eventually became a Major General in that branch. Tidwell received a Bachelor of Arts from Ohio Wesleyan University in 1961 and served in the U.S. Coast Guard from 1962 to 1966. He received a Juris Doctor from American University, Washington College of Law, in 1965. He was an attorney in the Office of the General Counsel for the U.S. Government Accounting Office from 1965 to 1969.

Tidwell then held a series of positions within the United States Department of the Interior, first as a staff attorney from 1969 to 1971, then as an assistant solicitor for procurement until 1974, associate solicitor for general law until 1976, and associate solicitor for energy and resources until 1977. During this time, Tidwell received an Master of Laws degree from the George Washington University Law School in 1974.

Tidwell was an associate solicitor for mine safety and health in the U.S. Department of Labor from 1977 to 1980, and was then deputy solicitor and counselor to the United States Secretary of the Interior from 1980 to 1983. Tidwell also served as corporate secretary and as a board member for KECO Industries, Inc., from 1979 to 1982.

Federal judicial service
On March 30, 1983, Tidwell was nominated by President Ronald Reagan to a seat on the U.S. Claims Court vacated by Louis Spector. Confirmed by the Senate on May 16, 1983, Tidwell received his commission the following day. He assumed senior status on May 16, 1998.

Personal life
Tidwell and his wife Rena have two sons, Gregory T. Tidwell and Jeremy H. Tidwell.

References

External links 

Confirmation hearings on federal appointments : hearings before the Committee on the Judiciary, United States Senate, Ninety-eighth Congress, first session, on confirmation hearings on appointments to the federal judiciary and the Department of Justice. 4.J 89/2:S.hrg.98-372/ pt.1 (1983) 

1939 births
Living people
20th-century American judges
21st-century American judges
George Washington University Law School alumni
Judges of the United States Court of Federal Claims
Ohio Wesleyan University alumni
People from Kansas City, Missouri
United States Article I federal judges appointed by Ronald Reagan
United States Coast Guard officers
Washington College of Law alumni